Frederic Joseph DeLongchamps (June 2, 1882 – February 11, 1969) was an American architect. He was one of Nevada's most prolific architects, yet is notable for entering the architectural profession with no extensive formal training. He has also been known as Frederick J. DeLongchamps, and was described by the latter name in an extensive review of the historic importance of his works which led to many of them being listed on the U.S. National Register of Historic Places in the 1980s.

Life

Early life and education
Born Frederic Joseph DeLonchamps in Reno, Nevada on January 2, 1882, he was raised in Washoe County, graduating from Reno High School in 1900, then the University of Nevada in 1904 with a degree in mining engineering.

Career
DeLongchamps was employed as a mining engineer and draftsman in Inyo County, California before he embarked on a career in architecture. He spent a short time in San Francisco where he may have apprenticed, but he returned to Nevada in 1907 and formed a partnership with Ira W. Tesch.

From 1909 to 1938, DeLongchamps maintained his own firm and became one of Nevada's most prolific architects. He designed both private and public buildings including nine county courthouses in Nevada and California. He was awarded the contract to design the Nevada Buildings for the Panama-Pacific International Exposition (1915), winning a silver medal for his work. DeLongchamps was appointed Nevada State Architect in 1919 and was the only person to hold the position, which was abolished in 1926. During this time, he designed many state buildings.

In 1939, George L. F. O'Brien joined DeLongchamps in partnership in Reno, and Hewitt Wells added his name to the association in 1962. The architectural firm of DeLongchamps, O'Brien and Wells continued to design buildings, mainly in the Reno area, into the 1960s.

Legacy
DeLongchamps died in Reno, Nevada on February 11, 1969. He was survived by his son, Galen (08 Aug 1916-22 Jul 2001). He was the father-in-law of the noted poet and artist Joanne de Longchamps (that is how she spelled the name), who married DeLongchamps's adopted son Galen.

Russell Mills is one who worked as a draftsman for DeLongchamps and went on to have a career as an independent architect.

Works
Many of DeLongchamps' works have been listed on the National Register.

His works include:
Alpine County Courthouse, 14777 CA 89, Markleeville, CA, NRHP-listed
Carson City Public Buildings, Carson St., Carson City, NV, NRHP-listed
Douglas County Courthouse, 1616 Eighth St., Minden, NV, NRHP-listed
Douglas County High School, 1477 US 395, Gardnerville, NV, NRHP-listed
Douglass-Frey Ranch NRHP 15000796, Churchill County, Nevada 
Fallon City Hall, 55 E. Williams Ave., Fallon, NV, NRHP-listed
Farmers Bank of Carson Valley, 1597 Esmeralda Ave., Minden, NV, NRHP-listed
Joseph Giraud House, 442 Flint St., Reno, NV, NRHP-listed
Humboldt County Courthouse (Nevada), NRHP-listed
I.O.O.F. Building, Mason Valley, 1 S. Main St., Yerington, NV, NRHP-listed
Immaculate Conception Church, 590 Pyramid Way, Sparks, NV, NRHP-listed
Lyon County Courthouse, 31 S. Main St., Yerington, NV, NRHP-listed
MacKay School of Mines Building, University of Nevada, Reno campus, Reno, NV, NRHP-listed
Manzanita Hall, University of Nevada, Reno campus, Reno, NV.
McCarthy-Platt House, 1000 Plumas St., Reno, NV, NRHP-listed
Minden Butter Manufacturing Company, 1617 Water St., Minden, NV, NRHP-listed
Minden Inn, 1594 Esmeralda Ave., Minden, NV, NRHP-listed
Minden Wool Warehouse, 1615 Railroad Ave., Minden, NV, NRHP-listed
Nevada-California-Oregon Railway Passenger Station, 1400 Center St. Lakeview, OR, NRHP-listed
Nevada State Capitol (legislative wings only)
Nevada-California-Oregon Railroad Depot, Reno, Nevada
Mary Lee Nichols School, 400-406 Pyramid Way, Sparks, NV, NRHP-listed
Oats Park Grammar School, 167 E. Park St., Fallon, NV, NRHP-listed
Pershing County Courthouse, 400 Main St., Lovelock, NV, NRHP-listed
Reno National Bank-First Interstate Bank, 204 N. Virginia St. Reno, NV, NRHP-listed
Riverside Hotel, 17 S. Virginia St., Reno, NV, NRHP-listed
US Post Office-Reno Main, 50 S. Virginia St., Reno, NV, NRHP-listed
Vachina Apartments-California Apartments, 45 California Ave., Reno, NV, NRHP-listed
Washoe County Courthouse, 117 S. Virginia St. Reno, NV, NRHP-listed
Washoe County Library-Sparks Branch, 814 Victorian St. Sparks, NV, NRHP-listed
Webster School
Whittell Estate, 5000 NV 28 Incline Village, NV, NRHP-listed

Awards
Silver medal, Panama Pacific International Exposition, 1915, Nevada Buildings
Distinguished Service Award, University of Nevada, Reno, 1966

References
A Guide to the Frederic J. Delongchamps Architectural Drawings And Papers Collection , University of Nevada, Reno

Notes

External links

 
1882 births
1969 deaths
People from Reno, Nevada
Architects from Nevada
Reno High School alumni
20th-century American architects